The 1997–98 College of Charleston Cougars men's basketball team represented the College of Charleston in the 1997–98 NCAA Division I men's basketball season. The Cougars, led by 19th-year head coach John Kresse, played their home games at F. Mitchell Johnson Arena in Charleston, South Carolina as members of the Trans America Athletic Conference.

After finishing atop the conference regular season standings (14–2), the Cougars also won the 1998 TAAC tournament to earn an automatic bid to the NCAA tournament as No. 14 seed in the Midwest region. College of Charleston was beaten in the opening round by eventual Final Four participant Stanford, 67–57. The team finished with an overall record of 24–6.

Roster

Schedule and results 

|-
!colspan=12 style=| Regular season

|-
!colspan=12 style=| TAAC tournament

|-
!colspan=12 style=| NCAA Tournament

Source
<ref></ref

Awards and honors
Sedric Webber – TAAC co-Player of the Year
John Kresse – TAAC Coach of the Year

References

College of Charleston Cougars men's basketball seasons
College of Charleston Cougars
College of Charleston
College of Charleston Cougars men's basketball
College of Charleston Cougars men's basketball